José Luis Hernández Urquidy (born May 1, 1995) is a Mexican professional baseball pitcher for the Houston Astros of Major League Baseball (MLB).  Urquidy signed with the Astros as an international free agent in 2015 under the name of José Luis Hernández, as whom he was known until the start of the 2019 season.  He made his MLB debut in 2019.

Professional career

Minor leagues
Urquidy signed with the Houston Astros as an international free agent on March 2, 2015. He made his professional debut that same year, and spent his first professional season with both the Greeneville Astros and Tri-City ValleyCats, pitching to a combined 2–1 record and 3.35 ERA in  innings. He pitched 2016 with the Quad Cities River Bandits and Lancaster JetHawks, posting a 6–5 record and 2.94 ERA in 24 games (21 starts).

Urquidy missed the 2017 season recovering from Tommy John surgery. He returned in 2018 and pitched for Tri-City and the Buies Creek Astros, going 2–2 with a 2.35 ERA in 13 games (11 starts).  He started 2019 with the Corpus Christi Hooks before being promoted to the Round Rock Express.

Houston Astros

2019 (Rookie season)
On July 2, 2019, the Astros promoted Urquidy to the major leagues.  He made his debut that night in a start versus the Colorado Rockies, pitching  innings.  In 2019, he was 2–1 with a 3.95 ERA, as in nine games (seven starts) he pitched 41 innings.

In Game 4 of the 2019 World Series versus the Washington Nationals, Urquidy started for the Houston Astros, making him just the third Mexican-born World Series starting pitcher.  He threw five innings, giving up two hits while striking out four. With the Astros winning the game, Urquidy became the second Mexican-born pitcher to win a World Series game after Fernando Valenzuela.

2020
In 2020, Urquidy was 1–1 with a 2.73 ERA in five starts covering  innings.

2021
In 2021, Urquidy was 8–3 with a 3.62 ERA in 20 starts covering 107 innings.  In the postseason, he started Game 3 of the ALCS versus the Boston Red Sox, lasting less than three innings.  Urquidy was the winning pitcher in both of Houston's victories versus the Atlanta Braves in the World Series.   He started Game 2, throwing five innings of one-run ball with seven strikeouts as the Astros defeated Atlanta, 7–2.  With the win, Urquidy became the first Mexican-born pitcher to earn multiple World Series wins.  Pitching in relief in Game 5, he earned the win with one scoreless inning, making him the winningest internationally-born player in World Series history.

2022
On June 26, 2022, Urquidy started a contest with  hitless innings versus the New York Yankees before ceding a home run to Giancarlo Stanton.  Urquidy's performance extended a no-hit streak to  innings forged by Astros pitching, tying an expansion-era record.  On July 8, he reached a career-high eight innings in an 8–3 win versus the Oakland Athletics, allowing all three runs.  Urquidy spun seven scoreless innings on August 3 versus Boston, delivered a game score of 83 and tied his career high of 10 strikeouts on the way to a 6–1 win.  On August 15, he hurled  hitless innings versus the Chicago White Sox until allowing his lone hit against A. J. Pollock before being removed.

In a rematch of the prior year's World Series, Urquidy earned the win versus Atlanta after allowing two runs over seven innings, striking out six, as Houston won, 5–4.  The Astros had won 15 of his last 20 starts, and over his last 11, Urquidy was 7–1 with a 2.48 ERA.  He earned the win after tossing seven scoreless innings with eight strikeouts versus the Los Angeles Angels on September 4.

In 2022, Urquidy was 13–8 with a 3.94 ERA in 29 games (28 starts) covering  innings.

Urquidy made one appearance in the Astros' 2022 playoff run, pitching three scoreless innings in relief to help stabilize the Astros' bullpen in a 7–0 loss to the Philadelphia Phillies in Game 3 of the World Series.  Urquidy became the first Mexican-born player in Major League history to appear in three World Series. The Astros would go on to win in six games, earning Urquidy his first World Series championship, and become the 15th Mexican-born player to win a World Series.

2023
On January 13, 2023, Urquidy avoided arbitration with the Astros, agreeing to a one-year, $3.025 million contract for the season.

International career
On August 27, 2022, Urquidy committed to play for Team Mexico in the 2023 World Baseball Classic.

Personal life
Prior to the 2019 season, Urquidy was known as José Luis Hernández.

See also

 List of Major League Baseball players from Mexico
 List of World Series starting pitchers

References
Footnotes

Sources

External links

Living people
1995 births
Sportspeople from Mazatlán
Mexican expatriate baseball players in the United States
Major League Baseball players from Mexico
Major League Baseball pitchers
Houston Astros players
Greeneville Astros players
Tri-City ValleyCats players
Quad Cities River Bandits players
Lancaster JetHawks players
Buies Creek Astros players
Corpus Christi Hooks players
Round Rock Express players
Venados de Mazatlán players
2023 World Baseball Classic players